Water supply and sanitation in the United Kingdom is provided by a number of water and sewerage companies. Twelve companies and organisations provide drainage and sewerage services, each over a wide area, to the whole United Kingdom; and supply water to most customers in their areas of operation. There are also 'water only' companies which supply water in certain areas. Some companies are licensed to supply water or sewerage services using the networks of other providers.

England and Wales

In England and Wales the economic regulator of water and sewerage is Ofwat and the quality regulator is the Drinking Water Inspectorate.

Water and sewerage

Water only

Scotland
 Scottish Water (government)

Business users receive the services via a licensed provider and Scottish Water act as wholesaler.

Northern Ireland
 Northern Ireland Water (government)

Crown dependencies
 Jersey Water (private)
 Guernsey Water (government)
 Isle of Man Water Authority (government)

References

 
Utilities of the United Kingdom